Stejaru may refer to several places in Romania:

 Stejaru, Tulcea, a commune in Tulcea County
 Stejaru, Teleorman, a commune in Teleorman County
 Stejaru, a village in Scorțeni, Bacău Commune, Bacău County
 Stejaru, a village in Saraiu Commune, Constanţa County
 Stejaru, a village in Singureni, Giurgiu Commune, Giurgiu County
 Stejaru, a village in Roșia de Amaradia Commune, Gorj County
 Stejaru, a village in Perieți, Ialomița Commune, Ialomiţa County
 Stejaru, a village in Corcova Commune, Mehedinţi County
 Stejaru, a village in Farcașa Commune, Neamţ County
 Stejaru, a village in Ion Creangă, Neamț Commune, Neamţ County
 Stejaru, a village in Pângărați Commune, Neamţ County
 Stejaru, a village in Milcov, Olt Commune, Olt County
 Stejaru, a village in Brazi Commune, Prahova County
 Stejaru, a village in Crângeni Commune, Teleorman County
 Stejaru, a village in Pungești Commune, Vaslui County

See also 
 Bicaz-Stejaru Hydroelectric Power Station, Romania
 Stejar, a village in Vărădia de Mureș Commune, Arad County
 Stejarul, the Romanian name for Karapelit village, Dobrich Province, Bulgaria
 Stejar (disambiguation)
 Stejeriș (disambiguation)